Valdez or Valdés may refer to:

People
Valdez (surname)
Valdés (surname)
Valdez (Brazilian footballer) (born 1943), Brazilian footballer
Valdez “Val” Demings, U.S. politician

Geography
Valdés, Asturias, Spain
Valdez, Alaska, United States
Valdez oil terminal
Valdez, California, United States
Valdez, Esmeraldas, Ecuador
Valdez, Florida, United States
Valdes Island, Canada
Valdés Peninsula, Argentina

Other uses
Valdez (acrobatic), a back walkover that begins in a sitting position
Exxon Valdez, oil tanker involved in an oil spill in Alaska in 1989
Valdez Blockade, a protest by Alaskan fishermen in 1993